{{DISPLAYTITLE:C12H14N4O3S}}
The molecular formula C12H14N4O3S (molar mass: 294.33 g/mol, exact mass: 294.0787 u) may refer to:

 Sulfacytine
 Sulfametomidine